George Stiny is an American design and computation theorist.  He co-created shape grammars with James Gips.

Stiny was educated at MIT and UCLA. He is currently a Professor in the Computation Group of the Department of Architecture at MIT. He was on the faculty at UCLA for fifteen years before joining the MIT Department of Architecture in 1996. He has also held appointments at the University of Sydney, the Royal College of Art (London), and the Open University.

Published works
 Stiny, G. & Gips, J. (1972). Shape grammars and the generative specification of painting and sculpture. In Information Processing 71, pp. 1460–1465. North-Holland Publishing Company. link to article
 Stiny, G. (1975). Pictorial and Formal Aspects of Shape and Shape Grammars. Birkhäuser Basel.  link to book
 Stiny, G. & Gips, J. (1978). Algorithmic Aesthetics. University of California Press.  link to book
 Stiny, G. (1980). Introduction to shape and shape grammars. Environment and Planning B: Planning and Design 7(3), 343–351.
 Stiny, G. (1980). Kindergarten grammars: designing with Froebel's building gifts. Environment and Planning B: Planning and Design 7(4), 409–462. 
 Stiny, G. (2006). Shape: Talking about Seeing and Doing. MIT Press, Cambridge, MA. link to book
 The grammar of paradise: on the generation of Mughul gardens
 The Algebras of Design

External links
 George Stiny home page at MIT Architecture
 Full text of Algorithmic Aesthetics book
 Interview with Stiny, at MIT Libraries

Massachusetts Institute of Technology alumni
University of California, Los Angeles alumni
Year of birth missing (living people)
Living people
American designers
Design researchers
Architecture educators
MIT School of Architecture and Planning faculty